Group B of the 2014 FIFA World Cup consisted of Spain, the Netherlands, Chile, and Australia. This group contained the finalists of the previous World Cup in 2010: Spain (reigning champion) and the Netherlands (runners-up). Play began on 13 June and ended on 23 June 2014. The Netherlands and Chile progressed to the knockout stage, while Australia and Spain were eliminated after suffering two defeats in their opening two matches. Chile was eliminated by Brazil in the second round after penalties, while the Netherlands made their way to the semi-finals in which they lost to Argentina on penalties. The third place match was won by the Netherlands with a convincing 3–0 victory against Brazil.

Teams

Notes

Standings

Netherlands advanced to play Mexico (runner-up of Group A) in the round of 16.
Chile advanced to play Brazil (winner of Group A) in the round of 16.

Matches

Spain vs Netherlands

The two teams had met in 9 previous matches, including in the 2010 FIFA World Cup Final, won by Spain 1–0 after extra time. This was the first time in the FIFA World Cup that the previous finalists met in the group stage.

Halfway into the first half, the referee judged that Diego Costa caught a trailing leg from Stefan de Vrij's attempted tackle. Xabi Alonso scored the penalty kick for Spain, shooting into the bottom-right corner with his right foot, putting them into the lead. They were unable to keep the lead until half time though, with Robin van Persie scoring a 15-yard diving looping header after a long ball from Daley Blind from the left after he spotted Iker Casillas slightly off his line. In the second half, Blind assisted another goal for Netherlands, this time setting up Arjen Robben who controlled the pass before coming inside to finish with his left foot from ten yards out. Twelve minutes later, Netherlands scored again, as De Vrij headed the ball in from a tight angle from a Wesley Sneijder free kick on the left. Spanish goalkeeper Iker Casillas protested that he had been fouled by Van Persie, but the goal was allowed to stand and Casillas received a yellow card for his protest. Not long after this, a backpass from Sergio Ramos was miscontrolled by Casillas with his left leg, resulting in Van Persie gathering the ball and scoring into an empty net for his second goal of the game. The fifth goal for Netherlands was a solo effort from Robben. Having received the ball near the halfway line from a Wesley Sneijder pass, he outran Ramos, Jordi Alba and Casillas, before slotting the ball into the net from 10 yards out with his left foot.

The 5–1 scoreline was the biggest loss margin for a defending champion in the FIFA World Cup, and also Spain's second biggest loss in the World Cup after their 6–1 thrashing against Brazil in 1950. With their goals, Van Persie and Robben became the first Dutch players to score in three World Cups. Casillas and Xavi joined Andoni Zubizarreta as the only Spanish players to appear in four World Cups.

Chile vs Australia
The two teams had met in five previous matches, including in the 1974 FIFA World Cup group stage, a 0–0 draw.

Chile took a 2–0 lead within the first 15 minutes. First, Alexis Sánchez controlled an Eduardo Vargas header in the penalty area to slot home. Two minutes later, Jorge Valdivia's shot from a Sánchez pass doubled the lead. Australia pulled one back through a Tim Cahill header from a cross by Ivan Franjic before half time. Australia could not find the equaliser in the second half, and in stoppage time, Chilean substitute Jean Beausejour converted the rebound after Mauricio Pinilla's shot was saved by Mathew Ryan.

With their respective goals, Cahill became the first Australian player to score in three World Cups, while Beausejour became the first Chilean player to score in two World Cups.

Australia vs Netherlands
The two teams had met in three previous matches, all in friendlies, most recently in 2009.

The Netherlands took the lead after Arjen Robben collected a Daley Blind headed pass at the halfway line, burst into the penalty area and scored with a low shot to the goalkeepers left. Soon after the restart, Australia equalised through Tim Cahill's left-foot volley into the goal from the underside of the bar from Ryan McGowan's cross. Australia took the lead in the second half with Mile Jedinak's penalty, awarded for a handball by Daryl Janmaat, but Robin van Persie equalised after he received substitute Memphis Depay's pass and scored. Ten minutes later, Memphis Depay received a pass from Jonathan de Guzmán and his long-range effort beat Australia goalkeeper Mathew Ryan.

At the age of 20, Depay's goal made him the Netherlands' youngest scorer at World Cups.

Spain vs Chile
The two teams had met in ten previous matches, including twice in the FIFA World Cup group stage, both won by Spain (1950: 2–0; 2010: 2–1).

Chile opened the scoring when Charles Aránguiz squared a pass to Eduardo Vargas to score home in the penalty area. Near the end of the first half Alexis Sánchez's free kick was parried by Spanish goalkeeper Iker Casillas to Aránguiz who put in the rebound. Spain, which needed at least a point to stay alive in the competition, had its best chance in the second half which fell to Sergio Busquets, but he missed from close range. Spain's loss confirmed the qualification of both Chile and the Netherlands into the knockout stage, and eliminated both Spain and Australia.

Spain became the fifth defending champions to be knocked out in the group stage.

Australia vs Spain
The two teams had never met before. Australia forward Tim Cahill was suspended for the match due to accumulation of yellow cards.

In a match between two already-eliminated teams, Spain went in front in the 36th minute after Andrés Iniesta threaded a pass down the right to overlapping full-back Juanfran, who then crossed the ball low to David Villa to finish with a back flick of his right foot low to the net. In the second half, Fernando Torres scored Spain's second with a low finish from the left of the penalty area after a pass from Iniesta, before substitute Juan Mata, receiving a pass from Cesc Fàbregas, scored from the right of the penalty area with a low shot between the goalkeeper's legs.

Villa's goal was his ninth career World Cup goal. Already Spain's record World Cup goalscorer, he also joined Fernando Hierro, Raúl and Julio Salinas as Spanish players who had scored in three World Cups.

Netherlands vs Chile
The two teams had never met before. Netherlands forward Robin van Persie was suspended for the match due to accumulation of yellow cards.

With both teams already assured of qualifying for the knockout stage after their first two matches, this match would decide which team would win the group: the Netherlands needed only a draw while Chile needed a win. The Netherlands went in front in the 77th minute with a header from six yards by substitute Leroy Fer after a Daryl Janmaat cross from the right. Another substitute Memphis Depay got the second in injury time, when he scored from close range after Arjen Robben had made a run down the left before crossing from the byline. With this win the Netherlands won Group B with a perfect record of three wins out of three, while Chile finished as group runners-up.

References

External links

2014 FIFA World Cup Group B, FIFA.com

Group B
Group
Group
Chile at the 2014 FIFA World Cup
Australia at the 2014 FIFA World Cup